Antoni Viladomat i Manalt (20 March 1678, Barcelona - 22 January 1755, Barcelona) was a Catalan painter in the Baroque style.

Biography
His father was a gilder. He appears to have taken his first formal art lessons in the workshop of Pasqual Bailon Savall (c.1650-1691), a native of Berga like his father. Bailon's early death led Viladomat to become apprenticed with Joan Baptista Perramon (c.1664-1743). He remained with him for at least six years; possibly nine. After that, he worked on the Church of San Miguel (demolished in 1868) with the painter and architect, Ferdinando Galli-Bibiena. By this means, he became acquainted with Italian art.

In 1723, his opposition to the strict regimen imposed by the "Colegio de Pintores" (a Medieval-style painter's guild) led him to file a lawsuit so he could obtain the title of "licensed painter" and work freely. His suit was successful, but continued conflict led him to file another suit to retain the title in 1739.

His long career enabled him to paint at almost all the convents and monasteries in Barcelona. His cycle of twenty paintings on the life of Saint Francis of Assisi, originally created for the old Franciscan monastery from 1722 to 1724, are now in the collection of the Museu Nacional d'Art de Catalunya (National Art Museum of Catalonia). Some paintings historically attributed to him, at the Old Hospital de la Santa Creu and the Jesuit Church in Tarragona, have recently come into question.

In addition to painting, he taught drawing in his workshop. Apprenticeships there were eagerly sought after. His son, Josep Viladomat i Esmandia (1722-1786), also became a painter. He was best known for a cycle of paintings (in his father's style) on the life of Saint Thomas Aquinas.

References

Further reading
 Joaquin Fontanals del Castillo, Antonio Viladomat: el artista olvidado y maestro de la escuela de pintura catalana del siglo XVIII, C. Verdaguer (1877) 
 Rafael Benet, Antonio Viladomat: la figura y el arte del pintor barcelonés, Editorial Iberia (1947)
 Santiago Alcolea, Antoni Viladomat, Prensa Labor (1992)

External links 

 Virtual tour of the "Capilla de los Dolores" at the Basilica de Santa María de Mataró.
 Works by Viladomat in the Catalog of the Acadèmia de Sant Jordi

1678 births
1755 deaths
Spanish painters
Painters from Catalonia
Baroque painters
Painters from Barcelona